A chain reaction in chemistry or physics is a sequence of reactions where a reactive product or by-product causes additional reactions to take place.

Chain reaction or The Chain reaction may also refer to:

Media
 Chain Reaction (game show), an American game show
 Chain Reaction (radio), a BBC Radio 4 chat show
 Chain Reaction (novel), by Simone Elkeles
 "Chain Reaction" (Stargate SG-1), a TV series episode
 Chain Reaction, a 1995 video game in the Magical Drop series

Films
 Chain Reaction (1996 film), starring Keanu Reeves, Rachel Weisz, Morgan Freeman, and Fred Ward
 Chain Reaction (2017 film)
 The Chain Reaction, 1980 Australian film starring Steve Bisley

Music
 Chain Reaction (1960s band)
 Chain Reaction (record label)

Albums
 Chain Reaction (The Crusaders album), 1975
 Chain Reaction (Luba album), 1980
 Chain Reaction (John Farnham album), 1990
 Chain Reaction (Cuban Link album), 2005
 Chain Reaction (Distorted Harmony album), 2014
Chain Reaction: Yokohama Concert, Vol. 2, a 1977 concert recording by J. J. Johnson and Nat Adderley released in 2002

Songs
 "Chain Reaction" (Diana Ross song), 1985
 "Chain Reaction" (John Farnham song), 1990 
 "Chain Reaction", from the album The Best by Girls' Generation
 "Chain Reaction", from the 1974 album Soon Over Babaluma by Can
 "Chain Reaction", from the 1983 album Frontiers by Journey
 "Chain Reaction", from the 1985 album Straight No Filter by Hank Mobley
 "Chain Reaction", from the 1988 album Reach for the Sky by Ratt

Other uses
 Chain Reaction (horse), a Canadian Thoroughbred
 Chain Reaction (sculpture), a 1991 American peace monument created by Paul Conrad
  Chain Reaction Cycles, a retail website focusing on selling cycling goods

See also
 Nuclear chain reaction, a physical process
 Chain of events